Impact play is a human sexual practice in which one person is struck (usually repeatedly) by another person for the gratification of either or both parties which may or may not be sexual in nature. It is considered a form of BDSM.

There are a number of activities that qualify as impact play.

In erotic spanking the sub is struck on the buttocks either with the Dominant's open hand, or a rigid implement such as a paddle, cane or riding crop. In the latter case the activity is often referred to as paddling, caning or cropping.

In erotic flagellation the sub is struck with a flexible implement such a whip or belt. Whips are classified by how many falls they have:

 Single tails such as a bullwhip have a single fall. The associated activity is referred to as single tailing.
 Floggers, such as a cat o' nine tails have many falls. The associated activity is referred to as flogging.

For safety, impact play should be done on areas of the human body well protected by fat or muscle; spots to avoid include the kidneys, neck, tailbone, hipbones, the head and all joints. The usual targets for flagellation are the buttocks and the two areas of the upper back below the shoulder blades. With care, the thighs, the backs of the calves and the chest can be targets as well. Breasts are another potential (but high-risk) target, and should only be used with experience.

The use of a whip means that the Dom must take great care to hit the intended target area, and avoid wrapping; when a whip or flogger makes contact with the target area somewhere up its length and the remaining length wraps around the sub's body to deliver a sharp, non-erotic, and possibly injurious off-target blow, such as to the hipbones or ribs. The longer the falls, the more skill is required by the Dom to land a safe blow. Advanced flogging techniques use a pair of floggers employed in a martial arts style alternating pattern, a technique commonly referred to as "florentining" or "florentine flogging."

Less common forms of impact play include punching and face slapping.

The sensations produced by impact play depend on the area in which the impact is concentrated. Wide implements such as an open hand, paddle or flogger produce a dull "thuddy" sensation. Narrow implements such as a cane, riding crop, belt or single tail produce a sharp "stingy" sensation.

A slapper or smacker may also be used. This consists of a broad (3 to 4 inch wide) semi flexible leather paddle with rounded and tapered edges, designed to minimize the severity of tip strike.

History

One of the earliest depictions of erotic flagellation is found in the Etruscan Tomb of the Whipping from the fifth century BC, named after its depictions of eroticized flagellation. Another reference related to flagellation is to be found in the sixth book of the Satires of the ancient Roman Poet Juvenal (1st–2nd century A.D.) further reference can be found in Petronius's Satyricon where a delinquent is whipped for sexual arousal.

There are anecdotal reports of people willingly being bound or whipped, as a prelude to or substitute for sex, during the 14th century. Flagellation practiced within an erotic setting has been recorded from at least the 1590s, as evidenced by a John Davies epigram, and references to "flogging schools" in Thomas Shadwell's The Virtuoso (1676) and Tim Tell-Troth's Knavery of Astrology (1680). Visual evidence such as mezzotints and print media is also identified revealing scenes of flagellation in the 1600s, such as in the late seventeenth-century English mezzotint "The Cully Flaug'd" from the British Museum collection.

In the 1639 book, De Usu Flagrorum (which David Savran declared was the authoritative text on the subject for two hundred years), the author Ioannes Henricus Meibomius “rejoice[s]” to know that when someone doing flogging for sexual gratification was found in Germany, they would be burned alive.

John Cleland's novel Fanny Hill, published in 1749, incorporates a flagellation scene between the character's protagonist Fanny Hill and Mr Barville. This book is considered "the first original English prose pornography, and the first pornography to use the form of the novel". It is one of the most prosecuted and banned books in history. A large number of flagellation publications followed it, including Fashionable Lectures: Composed and Delivered with Birch Discipline (c1761), promoting the names of ladies offering the service in a lecture room with rods and cat o' nine tails.

Representations of erotic spanking and flagellation make up a large portion of Victorian pornography, for instance 1000 Nudes by Koetzle. Hundreds of thousands of engravings, photographs, and literary depictions of spanking and flagellation fantasies circulated during the Victorian era, including erotic novellas like The Whippingham Papers, The Birchen Bouquet, Exhibition of Female Flagellants or the pornographic comic opera Lady Bumtickler's Revels.

Theresa Berkley (died 1836) ran a high-class flagellation brothel at 28 Charlotte Street (which is today's 84–94 Hallam Street). She was a "governess", i.e. she specialised in chastisement, whipping, flagellation, and the like. In 1828 she invented the "Berkley Horse", an apparatus that reportedly earned her a fortune in flogging wealthy men and women of the time.  Her fame was such that the 1830 pornographic novel Exhibition of Female Flagellants was attributed to her, probably falsely.

Interest in sexual gratification received from giving, receiving and witnessing spanking began to increase during the 1800s (particularly within France and the United Kingdom). Interest was not only confined to spanking literature, but the development of photography during 19th century resulted in the beginning of the creation of spanking photography. In the context of literature, this growing demand caused the publication of numerous limited edition spanking novels (although, while the term novel is/was used many of these works from this time and subsequently can be instead classified as novellas).

This interest for spanking (both in regards to literature and photography) followed into the next century, with the early 20th century being considered the "Golden Age" of spanking literature. This period of spanking literature is marked by three notable characteristics. First, greater audiences were reached with the availability of less expensive editions and greater print runs. Second, many of the spanking novels contained numerous illustrations (many of which have fallen under public domain and are easily available online). Third, this period saw a gradual increase in the output and publication of spanking literature, growing particularly within the 1920s and peaking within the 1930s. Much of the output of spanking literature during this period was by French publishers, writers and illustrators. Similarly, within the context of spanking photography, France was also the home to the creation of much content, with the most notable studios being the Biederer Studio and the Ostra Studio. This "Golden Age" of spanking literature (and French spanking photography) came to an end as a result of the Second World War, more specifically due to the German occupation of France between 1940 and 1944 and later the enforcement of censorship laws. A somewhat notable exception to the decline of spanking literature during this period was John Willie’s bondage Bizarre magazine (published between 1946 and 1959). Of the many French works from the "Golden Age" few at the time were translated into other languages within which spanking literature was popular, namely English and German, but beginning during the mid-1960s a number of these French works were translated into English and published, along with these works being republished in French and older British works also being republished. The occurrence of this was facilitated by the availability of mass-produced paperbacks and changes in censorship laws.

Today, a subculture known as Christian domestic discipline (CDD) promotes spanking of wives by their husbands as a form of punishment; some describe CDD as a form of abuse and controlling behavior, but others consider it a simple sexual fetish and an outlet for sadomasochistic desires. Christian conservative radio host Bryan Fischer said to the Huffington Post that it was a "horrifying trendbizarre, twisted, unbiblical and un-Christian".

References

External links
The basics of flogging at Albany Power Exchange

BDSM
BDSM activities